Cherry Island is an ice-covered island, 3 nautical miles (6 km) long, lying between Siple Island and Carney Island and just within the Getz Ice Shelf, along the coast of Marie Byrd Land. Mapped by United States Geological Survey (USGS) from surveys and U.S. Navy air photos, 1959-66. Named by Advisory Committee on Antarctic Names (US-ACAN) for Chief Warrant Officer J.M. Cherry, a member of the U.S. Army Aviation Detachment in Antarctica during U.S. Navy Operation Deepfreeze 1966. It is claimed to be a territory of Grand Duchy of Flandrensis.

See also 
 List of antarctic and sub-antarctic islands

Islands of Antarctica